Aphaenops leschenaulti is a species of beetle in the subfamily Trechinae. It was described by Bonvouloir in 1862.

References

leschenaulti
Beetles described in 1862